The Tin Lids were an Australian children's pop group formed in 1990 with Eliza-Jane 'E.J.', Elly-May, Jackie and Mahalia Barnes all on vocals. They are the four children of Jane and Jimmy Barnes. The group released three albums, Hey Rudolph! (November 1991), which peaked at No. 6 on the ARIA Albums Chart, Snakes & Ladders (July 1992), which was nominated for Best Children's Album at the 1993 ARIA Awards, and Dinosaur Dreaming (1993). The group has also released four singles, "Christmas Day" (December 1991), which reached No. 40 on the ARIA Singles Chart and won Children's Composition of the Year at the 1992 APRA Awards, a cover version of Was (Not Was)'s song, "Walk the Dinosaur", "School" (August 1992) featuring the Yunupingu kids, and "Dinosaurs in Space" (1994).

History
Tin Lids is a Scottish rhyming slang for "kids", as the band members are all children of Scottish-born Australian rock musician, Jimmy Barnes, and his Thai-born wife, Jane Mahoney (born Jane Dejakasaya in Thailand): Eliza-Jane 'E.J.' (born 22 December 1984), Elly-May (born 3 May 1989), Jackie (born 4 February 1986) and Mahalia (born 12 July 1982). The group were in the children's choir as part of the back-up singers on their father's track, "When Your Love is Gone", from his solo album, Two Fires (September 1990). Their maternal uncle, Mark Lizotte, is an Australian rock musician, who also performs as Diesel or Johnny Diesel.

The Tin Lids released their first album in November 1991 as a collection of Christmas carols, Hey Rudolph!, which peaked at No. 6 on the ARIA Albums Chart. Most of the instrumentation was supplied by David Froggatt, the album's producer and arranger, it was recorded at Barnes' Freight Train Studios, Sydney. The album provided the first single, "Christmas Day" (December 1991), which reached No. 40 on the ARIA Singles Chart and won Children's Composition of the Year at the  1992 APRA Awards.

Their next single was a cover version of Was (Not Was)'s song, "Walk the Dinosaur", which was released in May 1992. The Canberra Times journalist described it as "a joint venture with Hanna Barbera and The Flinstones (sic). The video will feature guest appearances by Fred and Dino."

Their second album was Snakes & Ladders (July 1992), which was nominated for the ARIA Award for Best Children's Album in 1993.
Another single from that album, "School" (August 1992), was written by Mandawuy Yunupingu (lead singer of Yothu Yindi). That track was recorded by The Tin Lids and the Yunupingu kids, the latter group were the indigenous leader's daughters.

Barnes and Yunupingu were highlighting the Sister Schools project, which hopes that "schools with few or no Aboriginal children will forge educational and social links with schools with large numbers of Aboriginal children, in an attempt to foster tolerance and understanding." One of the singers, Dhapanbal Yunupingu, later recalled, "They took us all into Jimmy's studio, Jimmy's kids and us, and we did this recording. It took about a week, but we had a lot of fun."

The Tin Lids' third and final album, Dinosaur Dreaming (1993), featured "Walk the Dinosaur" and "Swamp Stomp" from Snakes & Ladders and provided the single, "Dinosaurs in Space" (1994). The group disbanded in that year.

Members
Eliza-Jane 'E.J.' Barnes (born 22 December 1984) (aged 7–10)
Elly-May Barnes (born 3 May 1989) (aged 2–5)
Jackie Barnes (born 4 February 1986) (5-8)
Mahalia Barnes (born 12 July 1982) (aged 9–12)

Discography

Studio albums

Singles

Awards and nominations

APRA Music Awards

ARIA Music Awards

References

Australian children's musical groups
Musical groups established in 1990
Musical groups disestablished in 1994
Family musical groups
Musical quartets
Australian pop music groups
Swan musical family
APRA Award winners
Sibling musical groups